Fabio Pammolli (born January 11, 1965 in Lucca) is an Italian economist, who is professor of finance and data science at Politecnico di Milano, and former president of Constructor University in Bremen, Germany.

Biography 
Pammolli graduated in economics at the University of Pisa and did his doctoral studies at the Sant’Anna School of Advanced Studies. In 1988-89 he served as an officer and as an instructor in Guardia di Finanza. From 1990 he served as an assistant and then as an associate professor at the University of Siena, while from 2001 he served as full professor at the University of Florence. Research stays have taken him to the Department of Physics at Boston University, where he collaborated with H.E. Stanley. He was then a visiting scientist at STICERD at the LSE, OFCE at Sciences Po, the Department of Economics, Harvard University and LIDS, at the Massachusetts Institute of Technology. From 2004 to 2013 he served as the founding rector of the IMT School for Advanced Studies in Lucca and worked there as a professor of economics, finance, and data science. In 2015 he served as a senior scientist at the Italian Institute of Technology, where he contributed to conceive and design the strategic plan of the Human Technopole.

In 2022 Pammolli was acting as the President of Constructor University (formerly Jacobs University) in Bremen, Germany. In the year of his presidency, Pammolli has successfully initiated a wealth of advancements at the university: he implemented a new organizational structure, initiated new study programs, and completed the transition from Jacobs to Constructor University. Pammolli was a member of the Strategic Advisory Board of https://constructor.org/science-sit-strategic-advisory-board . In his research, Pammolli combines methods from statistical physics and economics. He has covered a wide range of topics, which includes the analysis of growth, diversification, instability of companies, economies and financial systems.

Institutional Commitments 

From 2015 to 2020 he was a member of the Investment Committee of the European Fund for Strategic Investments (EFSI) at the European Investment Bank. From November 2021 onwards he serves as Chairperson of the Investment Committee of InvestEU, the European Commission's new stimulus plan to provide long-term finance for companies and support EU policies. Since November 2022, he serves as economic adviser to the Italian Minister of Economy and Finance.

Web Links
https://scholar.google.com/citations?user=qft7FqwAAAAJ&hl=it

Itemizations 

 ↑ Professor Dr. Fabio Pammolli becomes the new President of Jacobs University. In: jacobs-university.de. December 15, 2021, retrieved April 1, 2022 .
 ↑ European Union InvestEU ( Memento of 3 March 2022 at the Internet Archive )
 ↑ About SIT | Schaffhausen Institute of Technology. In: sit.org. Retrieved March 3, 2022 (English)

Living people
1965 births
Management scientists
Academic staff of Jacobs University Bremen
Academic staff of the Polytechnic University of Milan
University of Pisa alumni
Academic staff of the University of Florence